Nuria Llagostera Vives and María José Martínez Sánchez were the defending champions, but both chose not to participate.Alberta Brianti and Sara Errani won the final against Jill Craybas and Julia Görges 6–4, 6–1.

Seeds

Draw

Draw

External links
Main Draw

Internazionali Femminili di Palermo - Doubles
Internazionali Femminili di Palermo